Pueai Noi is a district (amphoe) in the southwestern part of Khon Kaen province, northeastern Thailand.

Geography
Neighboring districts are (from the south clockwise): Nong Song Hong and Ban Phai of Khon Kaen Province; Kut Rang and Na Chueak of Maha Sarakham province.

History
The minor district (king amphoe) Phueai Noi was established on 17 January 1977, with the two tambons Phueai Noi and Wang Muang from Ban Phai district. It was upgraded to a full district on 4 July 1994.

Administration
The district is divided into four subdistricts (tambons), which are further subdivided into 32 villages (mubans). Pueai Noi is a subdistrict municipality (thesaban tambon) which covers parts of tambons Phueai Noi and Sa Kaeo, and Sa Kaeo a subdistrict municipality which covers the remaining areas of the two subdistricts. There are two tambon administrative organizations (TAO), one for each of the remaining subdistricts.

References

External links
amphoe.com

Pueai Noi